The Lahti Symphony Orchestra (Sinfonia Lahti) is a Finnish orchestra, based in the city of Lahti.  The orchestra is resident at the Sibelius Hall.  The orchestra was founded in 1910, and placed under the control of the Lahti municipality in 1949.

History
Past chief conductors of the orchestra have included Ulf Söderblom (1985-1988).  Osmo Vänskä became principal guest conductor of the orchestra in 1985, and chief conductor in 1988.  During his tenure, he and the orchestra have achieved wide acclaim, particularly with performances and recordings of Sibelius.  Other recordings by Vänskä and the orchestra include music of Robert Kajanus and Einojuhani Rautavaara.  Vänskä concluded his tenure as Chief Conductor in 2008 and became Conductor Laureate of the orchestra.

Jukka-Pekka Saraste served as artistic advisor to the orchestra from August 2008 to July 2011.  In April 2009, the orchestra announced the appointment of Okko Kamu as its next chief conductor, as of the autumn of 2011, after the conclusion of Saraste's tenure as artistic advisor.  Kamu's initial contract was through the spring of 2014.   In November 2012, the orchestra announced the extension of Kamu's contract through the end of July 2016, at which time Kamu concluded his tenure as principal conductor. 

In August 2015, the orchestra announced the appointment of Dima Slobodeniouk as its next principal conductor, effective in the autumn of 2016, with an initial contract of 3 seasons.  In April 2018, the orchestra announced the extension of Slobodeniouk's contract with the orchestra through 31 July 2021, at which time he is scheduled to conclude his Lahti tenure.

In December 2018, Anja Bihlmaier first guest-conducted the orchestra.  In September 2019, the orchestra announced the appointment of Bihlmaier as its next principal guest conductor, effective with the 2020-2021 season, with an initial contract of 3 seasons.  Bihlmaier is the first female conductor named to the post.

In 2015, Dalia Stasevska first guest-conducted the orchestra.  In May 2020, the orchestra announced the appointment of Stasevska as its next principal conductor, effective with the 2021-2022 season, with an initial contract of 3 seasons.  Stasevska is the first female conductor to be named chief conductor of the Lahti Symphony Orchestra.

Kalevi Aho was appointed composer-in-residence for the orchestra in 1992, and the orchestra has recorded many of his recent works.

Chief conductors
 Martti Similä (1951–1957)
 Urpo Pesonen (1959–1978)
 Jouko Saari (1978–1984)
 Ulf Söderblom (1985–1988)
 Osmo Vänskä (1988–2008)
 Jukka-Pekka Saraste (artistic advisor, 2008–2011)
 Okko Kamu (2011–2016)
 Dima Slobodeniouk (2016–2021)
 Dalia Stasevska (2021–present)

References

External links
 Official web site of the Lahti Symphony Orchestra

Musical groups established in 1910
Finnish orchestras
1910 establishments in Finland
Lahti
Performing groups established in 1910